The Helen Hay Whitney Foundation, established in New York in 1943 by Joan Whitney Payson in cooperation with the estate planning of her mother, Helen Hay Whitney (1875–1944), awards the "Helen Hay Whitney Postdoctoral Fellowship" for support postdoctoral research in the biomedical sciences.

Currently the Foundation awards 20 fellowships per year. The award is one of four highly competitive postdoctoral awards in the life sciences, and many of North America's leading scientists and medical researchers were supported in the early stages of their career by the Whitney Foundation.

Members of the Scientific Advisory Committee have included:
 Barbara Meyer
 Erin O'Shea
 Matthew Scharff
 Daniel Kahne
 Thomas Jessell
 Stephen C. Harrison
 Julie Theriot
 Jonathan Weissman
 S. Lawrence Zipursky

Notable fellows have included:
 Eric J. Ackerman
 David Agard
 Ronald A. Albright
 David J. Anderson
 Karen M. Arndt
 Cornelia Bargmann
 Margaret Baron
 Mary Anne Berberich
Megan Carey
 Elizabeth Chen
 Stephen Dinardo
 Thomas P. Dooley
 Stephen J. Elledge
 Stanley Fields
 Steven Finkel
 Andrew Fire
 Stephen C. Harrison
 Richard Henderson
 Tyler Jacks
 Wendell Lim
 Tomas Lindahl
 Santa J. Ono
 Susan Parkhurst
 Stanley Perlman
 Ronald T. Raines
 Michael Rosbash
 Gerald M. Rubin
 Rao Yi
 Keith Yamamoto
 Robert Weinberg
 Chris Q Doe

See also
 Jane Coffin Childs Memorial Fund for Medical Research
 Damon Runyon Cancer Research Foundation
 Life Sciences Research Foundation

Notes

Biomedical research foundations
Organizations established in 1943
Fellowships
1943 establishments in New York (state)
Medical and health foundations in the United States